Damjan Dervarič (born February 6, 1982) is a Slovenian professional ice hockey player who is currently on a try-out contract with HKM Zvolen of the Slovak Extraliga. He participated at the 2011 IIHF World Championship as a member of the Slovenia men's national ice hockey team.

Dervarič previously played for Acroni Jesenice and Havířov Panthers.

References

External links

 Profile at SiOL portal

1982 births
HDD Olimpija Ljubljana players
HK Acroni Jesenice players
Living people
Slovenian ice hockey defencemen
Sportspeople from Ljubljana